WLZR (1560 kHz) is a commercial AM radio station, licensed to Melbourne, Florida, and serving the Melbourne-Titusville-Cocoa area of the Space Coast. It is owned by Cumulus Media and broadcasts a sports radio format.  Most of the programming comes from the CBS Sports Radio Network.

By day, WLZR is powered at 5,000 watts, non-directional.  But because 1560 AM is a clear channel frequency, WLZR is a daytimer.  It must go off the air at sunset to avoid interference with older, higher power stations.

History
In 1968, the station signed on as WTAI.  An early DJ was Bryan Norcross, on-air as Barry O'Brien, who later became a well-known meteorologist for his coverage of Hurricane Andrew.

It switched its call sign to WTMS in 1997, WAOA in 2000 and WINT in 2003.

In October 2008, WINT flipped from an oldies format to an ESPN Radio all-sports format. On February 25, 2011, WINT went silent.  On December 13, 2014, WLZR returned to the air, simulcasting sports-formatted WSJZ 95.9 FM. On April 1, 2015, WLZR split from its simulcast with WSJZ (which switched an active rock format).  WLZR rebranded as "Sports Radio 1560 The Fan."

References

External links
FCC History Cards for WLZR

LZR
Radio stations established in 1968
Cumulus Media radio stations
1968 establishments in Florida
LZR